Jeferson Barbosa da Cruz (born 8 April 1999), known simply as Jeferson Cruz, is a Brazilian footballer who plays as a forward, most recently for Armenian side Yerevan.

Career
On 21 February 2020, the Football Federation of Armenia announced that FC Yerevan had withdrawn from the league due to financial and technical problems.

Career statistics

Club

Notes

References

1999 births
Living people
Brazilian footballers
Brazilian expatriate footballers
Association football forwards
Esporte Clube Vitória players
SC Austria Lustenau players
Austrian Regionalliga players
Austrian Football Bundesliga players
Brazilian expatriate sportspeople in Austria
Brazilian expatriate sportspeople in Armenia
Expatriate footballers in Austria
Expatriate footballers in Armenia